King Abdulaziz Air Base , also known as Dhahran Air Base and formerly Dhahran International Airport, Dhahran Airport and Dhahran Airfield, is a Royal Saudi Air Force base located in Dhahran in the Eastern Province, Saudi Arabia. Located west of Thuqbah and 7 km (4 mi) southeast of the Saudi Aramco Dhahran Camp, the airbase was the first Saudi Arabian airport to be constructed, in 1961, and is under the command of Air vice-marshal Prince Turki bin Bandar bin Abdulaziz Al Saud.

The airbase was initially built and operated by the United States Air Force from 1945 until 1962 and was known as the Dhahran Airfield. After use by the USAF, it was converted for commercial use and was known as the Dhahran International Airport, and was shared with the King Abdulaziz Air Base of the Royal Saudi Air Force. The military relationship that exists today between the United States and Saudi Arabia was highly influenced by the origin and development of this airfield.

During its commercial use phase from 1962 to 1999, it was one of Saudi Arabia's most influential and busy passenger airports and was commemorated on the 2nd issue 5-riyal banknotes and the 3rd issue 1-riyal banknotes. After the completion and inauguration of the King Fahd International Airport further north, the airport lost its commercial status and was once again converted for military use only; albeit by the Royal Saudi Air Force, which still uses it today.

History
During World War II, the Persian Gulf and Arabian Peninsula were important staging and shipping routes for the U.S. to provide both lend-lease assistance to the Soviet Union, as well as supply the allied forces fighting the Imperial Japanese forces in Asia.

Owing to Saudi Arabia's importance, primarily its location, in 1943 the US extended lend-lease status to Saudi Arabia, one of only three Arab countries to receive this aid.  In 1944, the U.S. War Department (renamed in 1949 the United States Department of Defense) proposed building an airbase in or near Dhahran, Saudi Arabia.

In 1945, the U.S. and Saudi Arabia agreed signed the Dhahran Air Field Agreement.  This agreement permitted the U.S. to build a small air field near the Arabian American Oil Company (ARAMCO) town.  The use of the term "air field", as opposed to "air base" was a direct result of U.S. sensitivity of Saudi Arabia's concerns regarding imperialism.  Further, full ownership of the airfield was scheduled to revert to Saudi Arabia at the conclusion of the war, after an agreed-upon three-year period during which the U.S. would have the rights to operate the field.

Despite the end of World War II in the European theater, in 1945, President Harry S. Truman signed the Agreement, which owing to the lack of any military justification, and again a reflection of Saudi Arabia's concerns regarding imperialism and the symbolism of foreign bases on their soil, was promptly rejected by the King.  The War Department, likewise, dropped their support of the project.  However, the U.S. State Department, recognizing the economic benefits of this location, and the diplomatic benefits afforded by the agreement, continued to pursue development of the Dhahran Air Field.  After Congress approved substantial economic development assistance, the U.S. State Department and the Saudi Government agreed, in August 1945, to develop the air field.  The War Department was forced to foot the cost of the construction.

In 1948, when the originally agreed-upon three-year post-war period of U.S. operations came to a close, the agreement was renegotiated.  While the airfield had not been completed until 1946, too late to be of any benefit for World War II  logistics (its original justification) it did provide benefits in the late 1940s, specifically in the context of the increasing tension between the U.S. and the Soviet Union.  In 1949 Dhahran airfield was the only airfield in the area which could support the United States Air Force (USAF)’s B-29s.  Thus, the airfield took on increasing importance in the U.S.’s eyes as one location in the U.S. strategy of the containment of communism.  For Saudi Arabia, the base provided an element of security from the U.S. forces posted there, among Saudi Arabia's growing concerns regarding their neighbors, particularly Yemen, and the Hashemites of Iraq and Transjordan.  The 1948 agreement reverted ownership of the air base to Saudi Arabia, and on-going year-to-year leases, for which the U.S. would pay rent.

On 18 June 1951, the two governments signed an agreement renewing and extending USAF usage rights at the airfield.

In a further renewal agreement dated 2 April 1957, the U.S. pledged to provide construction support to help the Saudis improve their commercial air facilities at the Dhahran Civil Air Terminal and to assist,
advise, and train the Saudi Army, Navy, and Air Force. To accomplish the tasks of assistance and training, the United States redesignated the Military Assistance and Advisory Group, in Saudi Arabia since 1949, as the United States Military Training Mission (USMTM). The USMTM staff, with headquarters at the Dhahran terminal, consisted of three sections representing the American armed services. Each section worked with the corresponding Saudi military service.

Civilian
Through the 1950s, the Dhahran airfield began to emerge as a commercial transportation hub, as the nearby Dammam oil fields increased the overall economic viability of the area. Additionally, Trans World Airlines began using Dhahran as a hub for increasing transport to and from Asia and Europe. The Dhahran airfield and the emerging support facilities became Dhahran International Airport in 1961, shortly before the United States relinquished control in 1962.

The airport terminal building is one of the architectural works of Minoru Yamasaki and was completed in 1961. The architecture is a blending of traditional Islamic forms with modern technology. For example, the flight control tower has the appearance of a minaret. Images of the terminal have been used on Saudi banknotes and is viewed as having influenced the design of a number of important buildings throughout the Middle East.

In 1980, Pan Am commenced a nonstop route to New York City using Boeing 747SP's. Passengers on the flight included Americans who resided in Dhahran and Saudis who studied at universities in the United States. However, the carrier announced in January 1986 that the service would cease the following month; Pan Am had sold its 747SP's and did not possess another aircraft type that could perform the flights.

Dhahran served a significant role in the 1994 evacuation of U.S. citizens and personnel from Yemen when that country slid into civil war.   During Operation Desert Focus in 1996, after the bombing of the Khobar Towers, the airport was used to relocate over 6,000 U.S. citizens and personnel within the Kingdom of Saudi Arabia. The Dhahran airfield continued to serve as the Eastern Provinces commercial air hub until the completion, in 1999, of the King Fahd International Airport near Dammam, when all scheduled flights were shifted out of Dhahran International Airport.

Military
King Abdul-Aziz Air Base has been a major RSAF airbase since the USAF left in 1962, providing air defence, tactical and strategic support for the Eastern Province and nearby regions, as well as providing aviation related technical training to RSAF personnel.

Between 1963 and 1999 the base was called Dhahran Air Base.

Between 17 September 1963 and 20 November 1963 the United States Air Force's 524th Tactical Fighter Squadron was deployed here with North American F-100 Super Sabres.

The Gulf War

A detachment of Royal Air Force Panavia Tornado GR1's from No. 31 Squadron RAF were based here during January 1991.

1990s
During October 1994 the USAF 75th Fighter Squadron (A-10 Thunderbolt II aircraft) was moved to Dhahran Air Base, prior to forward deployment to Ahmad al-Jaber Air Base, Kuwait.

In 1999, Dhahran Air Base was renamed King Abdulaziz Air Base.

Current use
Dhahran International Airport has been transformed into a military airbase. It has been renamed King Abdulaziz Air Base and serves the purposes of the Royal Saudi Air Force. There are also a couple of VIP airlines that operate out of DHA: Aviation-Link operates one A319 and B777-200, and NEXUS Flight Operations  operates one A319.
 RSAF 3 Wing: 
 No. 13 Squadron RSAF with the McDonnell Douglas F-15C Eagle and the F-15D
 No. 92 Squadron RSAF with the McDonnell Douglas F-15S Strike Eagle
 No. 44 Squadron RSAF with the Bell 412EP
 RSAF 11 Wing:
 No. 75 Squadron RSAF with the Tornado IDS  
 No. 83 Squadron RSAF with the Tornado IDS

Accidents and incidents 

 On October 19, 1950 a Douglas DC-3 crashed on takeoff from the airbase, killing one person on board and damaging the aircraft beyond repair.
 On December 30, 1956 a United States Air Force Military Air Transport Service Lockheed C-121 Constellation en route from Tripoli crashed on approach to the airfield, killing 12 of 38 on board. The cause was determined to be a combination of the inoperativity of Ground Controlled Approach (GCA) and poor visibility due to fog. The aircraft was damaged beyond repair.
 On April 17, 1964 Middle East Airlines Flight 444, a Sud Aviation SE-210 Caravelle III carrying 42 passengers and 7 crew, crashed 7 km offshore in the Half Moon Bay, approaching Dhahran International Airport from the south. The cause of the crash remains undetermined. All people on board lost their lives in the crash.
 On July 8, 1968, a Saudia Convair CV-340 carrying 11 people en route from Bahrain International Airport crashed 5 km (3 mi) south of the airport while attempting approach for the third time due to poor visibility caused by a sandstorm.
 On March 17, 1985, a Saudia Boeing 737-200 carrying 76 passengers and 21 crew from Jeddah to Riyadh was hijacked by a lone man armed with a grenade. After commandeering the aircraft up to Riyadh, the hijacker demanded to be flown to another destination, after which he was told that the aircraft would need to refuel in Dhahran. After letting everyone on the plane except the pilots disembark, the man was asked to surrender to security forces, which he refused to do. Subsequently, the aircraft was stormed; the man threw the grenade and was shot and killed.

See also

 List of things named after Saudi Kings
 Saudi Aramco Residential Camp in Dhahran
 Military Air Transport Service
List of military installations in Saudi Arabia

References

External links
Dhahran International Airport (in Arabic)
usace.army.mil
 Flight D, 7th Air Rescue Squadron, Dhahran Air Field, Saudi Arabia
 King Abdul Aziz Airbase, Dhahran (GlobalSecurity.org)

Dhahran
Military installations of Saudi Arabia
Royal Saudi Air Force
Airports in Saudi Arabia
Saudi Aramco